Das Tagebuch der Anne Frank (also known as Anne Frank's diary) is a 2016 German drama film directed by German filmmaker Hans Steinbichler and written by Fred Breinersdorfer. It stars Lea van Acken as the titular character, Martina Gedeck, Ulrich Noethen, and Stella Kunkat. The film is based on Anne Frank's famous diary and tells the story of Anne Frank, the Jewish girl who went into hiding with her family in Amsterdam and became a victim of the Holocaust.

The world premiere was held at February 16, 2016 in a special presentation for young people during the 66th Berlin International Film Festival. It was listed as one of eight films that could be the German submission for the Best Foreign Language Film at the 89th Academy Awards, but it was not selected. The film was theatrically released in Germany on March 3, 2016, by Universal Pictures International. It received a largely positive reviews from critics, with many praising van Acken's performance as Anne Frank, and grossed over $31 million.

Plot 
During the World War II, in the 1930s to 1940s, Anne Frank (Lea van Acken) gets a diary as a present for her 13th birthday. When the Nazis occupy the Netherlands, she goes into hiding with her family and other Jews in Amsterdam. During that time she writes down all her thoughts about the situation in her diary. Later the Jews are betrayed and brought to concentration camps.

Cast

Production 

The filming began on January 26, 2015 in Cologne. Further work was done until March 2015 in Bavaria, Berlin and Brandenburg. Some scenes were shot on original locations in Amsterdam, for example the Merwedeplein, where the Frank family lived before they went into hiding. The exterior shots of the Prinsengracht 263 were produced in the nearby Leidsegracht. The original Anne Frank House could not be used for this purpose because its look has changed since the 1940s.

The producers Michael Souvignier and Walid Nakschbandi acquired the worldwide and exclusive rights for films about Anne Frank's diary. They produced the film in cooperation with Universal Pictures. The work was supported by the Anne Frank Foundation, so the producers could use the whole archive.

The director Hans Steinbichler regards this film as a production for the younger generation. He said he wanted to make the story completely subjective and to transform the written texts of the diary into speech.

It was listed as one of eight films that could be the German submission for the Best Foreign Language Film at the 89th Academy Awards.

Release 
The world premiere was held at February 16, 2016 in a special presentation for young people during the 66th Berlin International Film Festival.

References

External links 

 
 

2016 films
Films about Anne Frank
German biographical drama films
Holocaust films
2016 biographical drama films
2010s German-language films
2010s German films
Films directed by Hans Steinbichler